India Scandrick is an American Broadway actress and one of two girls who landed the role as young Nala in the Broadway musical The Lion King. Her resume includes television acting roles in Tyler Perry's House of Payne, Disney 365, and Fox TV's Sleepy Hollow.  She also has appeared in films such as The Greening of Whitney Brown and other musicals like “A Christmas Carol” and “The Wiz.”

Scandrick was the first African-American girl to play Little Orphan Annie, and also had a supporting role in the telemovie, Life Is Not a Fairy Tale. She has recorded her first single "Wrong Move" produced by Producer Lil' Ronnie.

External links

India Scandrick on Myspace

Year of birth missing (living people)
Living people
American film actresses
African-American actresses
American stage actresses
21st-century American actresses
21st-century African-American women
21st-century African-American people